Nunki may mean:

 Nunki (Game), Bahá'í-Activity-Board-Game
 Sigma Sagittarii, star in the constellation Sagittarius